Edward John Stetzer (born 1966) is an American author, speaker, researcher, pastor, church planter, and Christian missiologist. Stetzer is Billy Graham Distinguished Chair of Church, Mission, and Evangelism at Wheaton College and Executive Director of the Billy Graham Center at Wheaton College. He is the North American Regional Director for Lausanne International. He is a contributor to the North American discussion on missional church, church planting, church revitalization, and Christian cultural engagement.

Early life and education
Stetzer was born in Long Island and grew up Catholic in Levittown, New York, outside New York City.

He holds master's degrees from Liberty University School of Divinity and the Southern Baptist Theological Seminary, a Doctor of Ministry from Beeson Divinity School, and a Ph.D. from the Southern Baptist Theological Seminary.

Ministry
Stetzer is Billy Graham Distinguished Chair of Church, Mission, and Evangelism at Wheaton College and Executive Director of the Billy Graham Center at Wheaton College. He will become the Dean of Talbot School of Theology in July of 2023. Formerly, he worked as Executive Director of LifeWay Research, a division of LifeWay Christian Resources, and as LifeWay's Missiologist in Residence. Before that, Stetzer served as Director of Research and Missiologist-In-Residence for the North American Mission Board.

Stetzer became Visiting Professor of Research and Missiology at Trinity Evangelical Divinity School in 2019.

Stetzer is a contributing editor for Christianity Today through his blog, The Exchange, a columnist for Outreach magazine. He is also the Executive Editor of The Gospel Project, a church curriculum produced by Lifeway Christian Resources.

In 2020, he became interim pastor at Calvary Baptist Church in New York City.

Published books

 Planting New Churches in a Postmodern Age (B&H Publishing Group, 2003)
 Perimeters of Light: Biblical Boundaries for the Emerging Church (with Elmer Towns, Moody Publishing, 2004)
 Breaking the Missional Code (with  David Putman; B&H Publishing Group, 2006)
 Planting Missional Churches (B&H Publishers, 2006)
 Comeback Churches (with  Mike Dodson; B&H Publishing Group, 2007)
 11 Innovations in the Local Church (with Elmer Towns and Warren Bird; Regal Publishing, 2007)
 Compelled by Love: The Most Excellent Way to Missional Living (with Philip Nation; New Hope Publishers, 2008)
 Lost and Found: The Younger Unchurched and the Churches that Reach Them (with  Richie Stanley and Jason Hayes; B&H Publishers, 2009)
 MissionShift: Global Mission Issues in the Third Millennium (with David Hesselgrave; B&H Publishing Group, 2010)
 Viral Churches: Helping Church Planters Become Movement Makers (with Warren Bird; Jossey-Bass, 2010)
 Transformational Church: Creating a New Scorecard for Congregations (with Thom S. Rainer, B&H Publishing Group, 2010)
 Subversive Kingdom: Living as Agents of Gospel Transformation (B&H Publishing Group, 2012)
 Compelled: Living the Mission of God (with Philip Nation, New Hope Publishers, 2012)
 The Mission of God Study Bible (with Philip Nation, B&H Publishing Group, 2012)
 Transformational Groups: Creating a New Scorecard for Groups (with Eric Geiger; B&H Publishing Group, 2014)
 Igrejas que transformam o Brasil: sinais de um movimento revolucionário e inspirador (with Sérgio Queiroz; Mundo Cristão, 2017)

References

External links
 The Official Website of LifeWay Research
 Ed Stetzer's website
 The Exchange
 Talbot School of Theology

Missiologists

1966 births
Living people
American evangelicals
Baptists from New York (state)
Missional Christianity
Southern Baptist Theological Seminary alumni
Samford University alumni
Shorter University alumni
People from Long Island
Liberty University alumni